Colehill is a parish neighbouring Wimborne Minster, in Dorset, England, with a population of 7,000 (2001), shrinking slightly to 6,927 people at the 2011 census.

History
The name Colehill originated in 1431 as Colhulle, becoming Colhill in 1518 and Collehill in 1547, but the origins of Colehill as a settlement predate this by a long way.

Six round barrows, which can still be seen, show that people lived here as early as 2000 BC.  The River Stour would have been navigable; there is evidence that in about 500 BC, peoples from Continental Europe were populating the South West, bringing the culture of the early Iron Age. Fortifications at Hengistbury Head and more forts inland were established then.

Part of the tracks survive, running parallel to the river from the coastal fort through modern locations such as Parley and Stapehill to Badbury Rings.  It is very likely that the line of Middlehill Road derives from one of these very early tracks.

Later in Roman times Wimborne developed as an important trading centre on the River Stour, and as a junction for further tracks from Poole to Badbury Rings and on to Salisbury.  Another track radiating eastward possibly set the line for what was to become in modern times the A31.  Bridges replaced the fords (Canford) in about 100 AD.

There then followed the Saxon invasion and the formation of the Kingdom of Wessex.  Agriculture became established and with it clearance of some small plots on the sunny heathland slopes around Colehill. Over the centuries farms grew until, with the impetus of the Inclosure Acts (1750 to 1860), they were consolidated into the estates that we know of today - Kingston Lacy, Hanham and Uddens estates.

Colehill today

There are two first schools in Colehill (Colehill First School and Hayeswood First School), a primary school (St Catherine's RC Primary School & Kindergarten), a middle school (St Michael's) and a foundation school (Beaucroft Foundation School (SEND)). There is also a private school (Dumpton's ). The main public hall is the large memorial hall, and nearby is the community library which was re-opened in February 2013.  It is now run by volunteers with some support from the then Dorset County Council and its successor council, Dorset Council. Colehill has a pharmacy, a hairdressers, and three post offices and convenience stores.

A parish plan for Colehill was published in 2008. Many of the planned actions have been implemented, including the community library mentioned above. A website was published in November 2008; it is updated regularly and all local organisations are encouraged to contribute.  Colehill appears on Twitter and Facebook. Traffic calming in Middlehill Road has been introduced and the major roundabout on the A31 at Canford Bottom has been re-engineered.  A parish initiative succeeded in rebuilding the Reef as a youth and community centre for the people of Colehill and Wimborne. Over £500K was raised locally and assistance given by East Dorset District Council.  The building was completed in 2016 and is fully in use with the activities continuing to expand.

There are a few houses in Colehill dating from the 1860s and rapid expansion took place in the 20th century. The population rose from 1786 in 1951 to 5370 in 1971.  Several large estates of modern family homes were built and there is quite a lot of infill building. The Parish Church, Church of England, is St Michaels and All Angels. It was designed by Caröe in 1893 and is a half brick and half timber construction in the Arts and Crafts style. Nearby and close to the war memorial at the centre of the village are the Triangle Woods which have village green status. There are areas of common land, a recreation ground at Oliver's Park, and a Local Nature Reserve at Leigh Common. The area is well wooded and the local Forestry Commission plantation at Cannon Hill is very popular for walking.

The District Council's Core Strategy, approved in 2013, placed over half of East Dorset's New Neighbourhood development in Colehill; it comprises 630 homes along the Cranborne Road and 350 south of the Leigh Road A31. As of 2014 a significant part of Colehill (including the New Neighbourhoods) was designated as a parish ward of Wimborne.  In part compensation areas of Stapehill, west of the Canford Bottom roundabout, were transferred from Ferndown to the Colehill parish ward.

Notable People
Tim Berners Lee- World Wide Web creator

Micheal Medwin- Actor

Roger Johnson- Footballer

Al Stewart- Musician

Politics
There are three electoral wards within the parish (Colehill East, Colehill Hayes & Colehill West).  In the new unitary Dorset Council (May 2019) these wards were joined with the Wimborne Minster East electoral ward to form a two-member electoral division (Colehill & Wimborne Minster East).

Colehill became part of the Mid Dorset and North Poole constituency at the 2010 general election.

References

External links 
 Colehill Parish Council Website

 

Villages in Dorset